was a Japanese Major General and poet during the 20th Century. He is commonly associated with the Jinan incident, playing a major role in the diplomatic and public press of the incident. He was also known for his tanka poetry works.

Biography
Due to being poor, Ryū was sent to an apprenticeship during his childhood. After attending the Matsumoto Junior High School (modern-day Nagano Matsumoto Fukashi High School), he graduated from the Imperial Japanese Army Academy as part of its 12th class in 1901 and was commissioned as an infantry lieutenant. When he was in middle school under the old system, he was adopted by Jun Saitō, a doctor and kangaku.

In 1903, he was promoted to first lieutenant and served in the Russo-Japanese War in 1904. Around this time, he sent a letter to Nobutsuna Sasaki, requesting for lessons on tanka poetry. He returned the following year with an injury and was awarded the Order of the Golden Kite, 5th Class. In 1906 he was promoted to captain and in 1909, graduated from the Army War College as part of its 21st class along with Juichi Terauchi, Kōtarō Nakamura, Kōhei Kashii as his classmates. He studied under Sasaki for Chikuhakukai's poetry magazine Kokoro no Hana.

In 1914, he was promoted to major and served under Yusaku Uehara as a staff officer of the Inspectorate General of Military Training and was promoted to colonel in 1918. In 1924, he became the Chief of Staff of the 7th Division in Asahikawa. In 1930, he was placed in the reserves and in 1936, he was imprisoned for five years due to his participation in the February 26 incident. He was then stripped of his rank and imprisoned where he served his sentence with Yasuhide Kurihara, who was a close friend of his family.

After being released from prison in 1938, while working as a militarist ideologue, he founded and became involved with tanka as a poet. Saitō was listed as one of the selection committee members of the 1942 . In 1945, he evacuated to Ikeda, Nagano and was expelled from public office. After the war, he published a memoir of the February 26 incident along with a collection of poems. In 1953, he died at the House of History at Nagano.

Call with Kurihara
On the early hours of February 29, just before the end of the incident, one of the phone calls made by Kurihara managed to reach Saitō per court documents by Shunpei Sakisaka. During the call, Saitō said:

In response, Kurihara replied:

Saitō replied with

Kurihara ended the conversation with:

In addition, Kurihara asked Saitō to confirm the edict due to the army's upper management not formally submitting to the revolution. The instance of the transcript occurred during the documentary series . When Seiichi Nakata, who was the producer of the program, sent a copy of the recording to Shi, he thanked him and said, "I'd like to listen to it when my heart calms down someday." It is unknown whether he heard it.

In his postwar memoir "2.26," Saitō wrote that during the incident, he suspected that someone had intercepted his home phone, and that it was believed to have been made by a military intelligence agency. He wrote that he often received phone calls that seemed to be irrelevant and conspiratorial. The latter suspicion was also found to be highly likely to be true based on the Sugasaka materials and the testimony of the people involved in the interception at the time. It was also found that he had hardly called himself due to being wary of an interception.

Court Ranks
Senior Eighth Rank (October 10, 1901)

Awards
Order of the Golden Kite, 5th Class (April 1, 1906)
Order of the Rising Sun, 6th Class (April 1, 1906)

Works
"Young Officer's Training" Military Magazine 1915
Misty Flower" Chikuhakukai Kokoro no Hana Sosho 1929
Appreciation of Manyo Masterpieces, Jinshoin, 1935
"Hato Poetry Collection" Jinshoin 1939
"Akudoki Tanka and Zuisou" Sanseido 1940
"Records in Prison" Tokyodo 1940
"Song of the Defender" Tokyodo 1942
"Four Heavenly Clouds" Tokyodo 1942
The Heart of Manyo, Asahi Shimbun, 1942
"My Sadness" Naka Shoten 1942
"Book of Belief: Japanese World View and Guiding Principles" Tokyodo 1943
"Famous Woman Review" Jinshoin 1944
"Light soil" Yakumo Shoten New Japanese anthology 1945
"Nature and Tanka" Jinshoin 1947
"2.26" Kaizosha 1951

Co-Authored
"Nikudan Sings" edited by Yakumo Shorin 1939
Sanseido 1941 _
"Japan's final battle this year" co-written by Koichiro Ishihara Meirinkai Kyoto Branch 1941

References

Bibliography

1879 births
1953 deaths
Japanese generals
20th-century Japanese poets
People of Meiji-period Japan
People of Taishō-period Japan
People of Shōwa-period Japan
Japanese military personnel of the Russo-Japanese War
Prisoners and detainees of Japan
Recipients of the Order of the Sacred Treasure
Recipients of the Order of the Rising Sun
Imperial Japanese Army Academy alumni